Itsuo (written: 逸夫 or 威夫) is a masculine Japanese given name. Notable people with the name include:

, Japanese pole vaulter
, Japanese philosopher and aikidoka

Japanese masculine given names